The Marsh Glacier is a glacier about 110 km (70 mi) long, flowing north from the Antarctic polar plateau between the Miller Range and Queen Elizabeth Range into Nimrod Glacier. Seen by a New Zealand party of the CTAE (1956–58) and named for G.W. Marsh, a member of the party.

See also
 List of glaciers in the Antarctic

References

Glaciers of Shackleton Coast